Denis-Benjamin Viger (August 19, 1774 – February 13, 1861) was a 19th-century politician, lawyer, businessman in Lower Canada.  He was a leader in the Patriote movement.

Viger was part of the militia in the early 19th century and then a captain in the War of 1812.  He retired from the militia in 1824 with the rank of major.

Biography
Viger was born in Montreal to Denis Viger and Périne-Charles Cherrier.  His father had represented Montreal East district in the Legislative Assembly of Lower Canada from 1796 to 1800. In 1808, he married  the 30-year-old daughter of Pierre Foretier, Marie-Amable Foretier. They had one child who died in 1814.

He was elected to the Legislative Assembly of Lower Canada for Montreal East in 1808 and 1810, then in Leinster in  1810 and 1814 and in Kent in 1816, 1820, 1824 and 1827. In 1829, he was appointed to the Legislative Council of Lower Canada.

Prominent in the Patriote movement and denounced as the owner of seditious newspapers, Viger was imprisoned in 1838 when martial law was imposed in Lower Canada; refusing to post bail in protest of the repressive martial law and demanding a regular trial, he was not released until May 1840.

In 1841, he was elected to the Legislative Assembly of the Province of Canada representing Richelieu. From December 12, 1843 to June 17, 1846 he was one of the Joint Premiers of the Province of Canada. He was elected in a by-election to represent Trois-Rivières in 1845 but resigned in 1847. He was appointed to the Legislative Council in 1848 but lost his seat for nonattendance in 1858. Viger died in Montreal in 1861.

See also 
List of presidents of the Saint-Jean-Baptiste Society of Montreal

External links

Ancestors of Denis-Benjamin Viger (french)

1774 births
1861 deaths
Canadian prisoners and detainees
Members of the Legislative Assembly of Lower Canada
Members of the Legislative Assembly of the Province of Canada from Canada East
Members of the Legislative Council of the Province of Canada
Pre-Confederation Quebec people
Premiers of the Province of Canada
Members of the Executive Council of the Province of Canada
Presidents of the Saint-Jean-Baptiste Society of Montreal